Mount Senger is a 12,286-foot-elevation (3,745 meter) mountain summit located west of the crest of the Sierra Nevada mountain range in Fresno County of northern California, United States. It is set within the John Muir Wilderness, on land managed by Sierra National Forest. Senger ranks as the 348th-highest summit in California. The John Muir Trail traverses the south and west slopes of the mountain, providing an approach option.

History

The mountain was named in 1894 by Theodore Solomons to honor Joachim Henry Senger (1848–1926), philologist and professor at the University of California, Berkeley, who was one of the four founders of the Sierra Club in 1892. Senger contacted John Muir with the idea of forming a local 'alpine club' for mountain lovers. Senger and San Francisco attorney Warren Olney sent out invitations "for the purpose of forming a 'Sierra Club'. Mr. John Muir will preside". On May 28, 1892, the first meeting of the Sierra Club was held to write articles of incorporation. One week later, John Muir was elected president and Warren Olney was elected vice-president. This landform's toponym has been officially adopted by the U.S. Board on Geographic Names.

The first ascent of the summit was made during the 1907–09 USGS survey by George R. Davis, T. G. Gerdine, C. F. Urquhart, and L. F. Biggs. Today this peak draws climbing interest because it is included on the Sierra Peaks Section's peak bagging list.

Climate
According to the Köppen climate classification system, Mount Senger is located in an alpine climate zone. Most weather fronts originate in the Pacific Ocean, and travel east toward the Sierra Nevada mountains. As fronts approach, they are forced upward by the peaks (orographic lift), causing them to drop their moisture in the form of rain or snowfall onto the range. Precipitation runoff from this mountain drains into tributaries of the South Fork San Joaquin River.

Gallery

See also

List of mountain peaks of California

References

External links
 Weather forecast: Mount Senger
 Mt. Senger (photo): Flickr

Sierra National Forest
Mountains of Fresno County, California
Mountains of the John Muir Wilderness
North American 3000 m summits
Mountains of Northern California
Sierra Nevada (United States)